Escape from Rungistan is an interactive fiction video game written by Bob Blauschild for the Apple II and released by Sirius Software in 1982. Blauschild also wrote Critical Mass which was published by Sirius in 1983.

Plot
The instructions at the opening of the game describe the situation:

Gameplay
Rungistan combines graphical elements with text-based commands. The game begins with the player sitting in a jail cell and one is asked to enter a command. In certain situations, the player is required to perform a certain action before the time runs out, such as defusing a bomb. It also includes arcade-like sequences, such as skiing down a hill and avoiding trees.

Reception
Softline in 1982 liked the "precise, colorful graphics", animated arcade sequences, and built-in hints, and stated that "The puzzles are otherwise challenging enough for the average adventurer".

Reviews
 Casus Belli #12 (Dec 1982)

References

External links 
 

1980s interactive fiction
1982 video games
Apple II games
FM-7 games
NEC PC-8801 games
North America-exclusive video games
Sirius Software games
Video games developed in the United States
Video games set in Africa